This is a list of members of the South Australian House of Assembly from 2022 to 2026, as elected at the 2022 state election and subsequent by-elections.

See also
 Members of the South Australian Legislative Council, 2022–2026

Members of South Australian parliaments by term
21st-century Australian politicians